Joseph Henry Herbert (21 January 1895 – 1959) was an English footballer who played for Rochdale when they joined the English Football League in 1921. He also played non-league football for a number of other clubs..

References

Rochdale A.F.C. players
Kimberworth Old Boys F.C. players
Rotherham County F.C. players
Norwich City F.C. players
Guildford City F.C. players
Swansea City A.F.C. players
English footballers
Footballers from Rotherham
1895 births
1959 deaths
Association football wingers